Phassus agrionides is a moth of the family Hepialidae. It is known from Brazil.

References

Moths described in 1856
Hepialidae